
Year 796 (DCCXCVI) was a leap year starting on Friday (link will display the full calendar) of the Julian calendar. The denomination 796 for this year has been used since the early medieval period, when the Anno Domini calendar era became the prevalent method in Europe for naming years.

Events 
 By place 

 North America 
 The Three Fires Confederacy is formed at Michilimackinac.

 Europe 
 King Charlemagne organizes an invasion of the Avar Khaganate, with one army under his son Pepin of Italy and another army under one of his vassals, the Croat Duke Vojnomir. The two armies launch a successful two-pronged invasion of the Avar Khaganate (modern Hungary). They seize the Avar "ring" (the nomadic tent capital), destroying Avar power before returning with so much booty in gold and jewels that 15 wagons, each drawn by four oxen, are needed to bring it back to Frankish territory. Charlemagne wins a major victory (in which the Lower Pannonian duke Vojnomir aids him), and the Franks make themselves overlords over the Croatians of northern Dalmatia, Slavonia, and Pannonia. Frankish missionaries are sent to the area to convert the pagan population to Christianity.

 Britain 
 April 18 – King Æthelred I of Northumbria is murdered, probably at Corbridge, by his ealdormen, Ealdred and Wada. Another rival, Torhtmund, slays Ealdred in revenge. Northumbria is plunged into chaos. The patrician Osbald is placed on the throne, but is deserted by his supporters after only 27 days. He flees from Lindisfarne to Pictland. Another faction brings back Æthelred I's old back-from-the-dead rival, Eardwulf, as the new king. He dismisses his wife and publicly takes a concubine. Eardwulf is alienated from Archbishop Eanbald of York.
 King Offa of Mercia and Charlemagne seal a trading agreement, and a marriage alliance is proposed. However, Offa dies after a 39-year reign, that has incorporated Kent, Essex, Sussex, and East Anglia into the Mercian realm. Offa is buried at Bedford, and succeeded for a short time by his son Ecgfrith, and then a distant cousin, Coenwulf.
 The Kingdom of Sussex again becomes independent from the Kingdom of Mercia following the death of King Offa.
 Prince Eadberht Præn leaves the Church, returns to Kent and claims his throne. Eadwald proclaims himself king of East Anglia, but is later ousted by Coenwulf. Direct rule from Mercia is re-established.

 By topic 
 Religion 
 Alcuin, Anglo-Saxon monk and scholar, is appointed as abbot by Charlemagne, who puts him in charge of leading Marmoutier Abbey in Tours.
 Tō-ji, a Buddhist temple of the Shingon sect, is established in Kyoto, Japan.

Births 
 Al-Mu'tasim, Muslim caliph (d. 842)
 Dhul-Nun al-Misri, Egyptian scholar and Sufi (d. 859)
 Ibrahim ibn Ya'qub al-Juzajani, Muslim hadith scholar
 Liu Zhuan, chancellor of the Tang Dynasty (d. 858)
 Lü Dongbin, Chinese scholar and poet
 Xiao Fang, chancellor of the Tang Dynasty (d. 875)

Deaths 
 April 18 – Æthelred I, king of Northumbria
 June 12 – Hisham I, Muslim emir (b. 757)
 July 29 – Offa, king of Mercia (b. 730)
 August 10 – Eanbald, archbishop of York
 Colla mac Fergusso, king of Connacht (Ireland)
 Ecgfrith, king of Mercia
 Fujiwara no Tsuginawa, Japanese statesman (b. 727)
 Muhammad ibn Ibrahim al-Fazari, Muslim philosopher (or 806)
 Sibawayh, Persian linguist and grammarian (b. 760)
 Tassilo III, duke of Bavaria (approximate date)

References